The Women's bantamweight is a competition featured at the 2011 World Taekwondo Championships, and was held at the Ballerup Super Arena in Copenhagen, Denmark on October 16. Bantamweights were limited to a maximum of 53 kilograms in body mass.

Medalists

Results
Legend
DQ — Won by disqualification

Finals

Top half

Section 1

Section 2

Bottom half

Section 3

Section 4

References
 Official Report

Women's 53
World